Zebra is a hard rock band founded in 1975 in New Orleans, Louisiana.  It features Randy Jackson (guitar and vocals), Felix Hanemann (bass, keyboards and vocals) and Guy Gelso (drums and vocals).

Biography 
In the early 1970s, Jackson and Hanemann played together in a group called Shepherd's Bush, but in 1974 they left Shepherd's Bush and founded a new band with Gelso on drums. The group initially was a cover band, playing Led Zeppelin and other technically proficient rock groups such as Yes, Jethro Tull, and Pink Floyd. In 1975, the group adopted the name Zebra after seeing a cover of the magazine Vogue featuring a woman riding a zebra. Initially based in New Orleans, they increasingly played more often on Long Island, and eventually all three members moved there to pursue success. They had introduced their original material into their cover sets years before they were signed to Atlantic Records, including "The La La Song", "Free" and "Bears" (originally entitled "The Bears are Hibernating").

Zebra had been noticed by local colleges and even had some of their early original performances recorded by Long Island FM radio station WBAB, culminating in the inclusion of one of their songs on a release of "WBAB Homegrown Album", which commemorated local acts and performances culled from the station's on-air "Homegrown Hour" program.

Zebra's mainstream debut on Atlantic Records was in 1983 with their eponymous album, produced by Jack Douglas and featuring the singles "Tell Me What You Want" and "Who's Behind The Door?" The band continued to tour throughout the 1980s, but took a temporary break in the early 1990s after being dropped by Atlantic Records. Randy Jackson formed his solo band Randy Jackson's China Rain, and released its only album in the year 1991. Zebra finally reunited in 1994 and released Zebra IV in 2003, their first album of all-new material since 1986. A DVD of live performances, mostly from a show at the House of Blues in New Orleans, was released in the summer of 2007.

On July 10, 2010, during their 35th-anniversary performance at New Orleans' Mahalia Jackson Theater, Zebra was inducted into The Louisiana Music Hall of Fame. On October 8, 2012, Zebra was inducted into the Long Island Music Hall of Fame. In March 2013, Zebra performed on Cruise to the Edge, a concert cruise featuring notable progressive rock bands including Yes, Steve Hackett, U.K., Carl Palmer Band, Ambrosia, Saga, Nektar, Glass Hammer, and IOEarth.

Although Zebra has not released any studio material since 2003's Zebra IV, the band continues to perform live, mostly in the Gulf Coast and East Coast of the United States, including New Orleans and New York City. In February 2017, Jackson reported to Shreveport Times that the band was working on a new album: "I have new material and hopefully we’ll get to work on a new record in the next couple of months." As of March 2022, there has been no news of the project.

Band members 
 Randy Jackson – Lead vocals, guitars, percussion, keyboards, synthesizer, mellotron, piano (1975–present)
 Felix Hanemann – Bass, strings, keyboards, synthesizer, vocals (1975–present)
 Guy Gelso – Drums, percussion, vocals (1975–present)

Discography

Studio albums 
 Zebra (1983) (Gold) U.S. No. 29
 No Tellin' Lies (1984) U.S. No. 84
 3.V (1986)
 Zebra IV (2003)

Live albums 
 Live (1990)
 King Biscuit Flower Hour (1999)

Compilation albums 
 The Best of Zebra: In Black and White (1998)

Singles

Video albums and concert films 
 Zebra Videos And More VHS (1999)
 Zebra the DVD (2007) Produced by Peter Kuperschmid   directed by Scot Jay

Awards and nominations

References

External links 
 

American hard rock musical groups
Atlantic Records artists
Musical groups from New Orleans
Heavy metal musical groups from Louisiana
Musical groups established in 1975
Rock music groups from Louisiana
American progressive rock groups
1975 establishments in Louisiana
American musical trios